Armanum, was a city-state in the ancient Near East whose location is still unknown. It lies in the same general area as Mari and Ebla. It is known from texts of the Akkadian period, during the reign of Naram-Sin of Akkad. The proposed site of Armanum is Tall Bazi.

Armanum is mentioned in three sources:

Year Name of Naram-Sin - Rulers of that period named the years of their reign after major events that occurred in them, in this case "The year in which Naram-Sin conquered Armanum and tore d[own its] walls".

Royal Tutelary - Afterwards, Naram-Sin added "conqueror of Armanum and Ebla" to his tutelary.
Statue Inscription - A Old Babylonian table fragment (UET 1 275) was found in Ur which was a copy of an inscription on a statue of Naram-Sin which at that time stood in the Temple of Sin next to a statue of Sin-Eribam, a ruler of Larsa. It described the military campaign during which Armanum was defeated. The text begins "As to the fact that from immemorial time, since the creation of mankind, no king among kings had plundered Armanum and Ebla with the axes of Nergal, he (= Dagan) opened the path of Naram-Sin the mighty and gave him Armanum and Ebla." It includes a detailed description of Armanum as being ona high hill with three concentric city walls. In 2009, a Akkadian Period inscription fragment (IM 221139) was found during excavations by Iraqi archaeologists at Tulul al-Baqarat which also carried part of the Naram-Sin Syrian military campaign and permitted a more complete reconstruction including the capture of 80,508 prisoners. One passage reads "[Indeed,] with the weapon of Dagan, the one who magnifies his kingship, Naram-Sin the mighty conquered Armanum and Ebla. (120–230) Moreover, from the edge of the Euphrates as far as Ulisum, he smote the peoples whom Dagan had newly bestowed upon him so that they (now) carry the (work) basket of Ilʾaba, his god and took full control of the Amanus, the cedar mountain.".

See also
Cities of the ancient Near East

References

Ancient cities of the Middle East
Akkadian cities